Memecylon rostratum is a species of plant in the family Melastomataceae. It is endemic to Sri Lanka.

Culture
Known as "kuratiya - කූරටියා" in Sinhala.

References

rostratum
Vulnerable plants
Endemic flora of Sri Lanka
Taxonomy articles created by Polbot